Arawana arizonica is a species of lady beetle in the family Coccinellidae. It is found in North America.

References

Further reading

 
 
 
 
 
 

Coccinellidae
Beetles described in 1899